The 1977 Metro Conference men's basketball tournament was held March 3–5 at the Mid-South Coliseum in Memphis, Tennessee. 

Defending champions Cincinnati defeated  in the championship game, 74–61, to win their second Metro men's basketball tournament.

The Bearcats, in turn, received a bid to the 1976 NCAA Tournament. They were joined by fellow Metro member, and tournament runner-up, Louisville, who earned an at-large bid.

Format
All seven of the conference's members participated in the tournament field, including new member Florida State. They were seeded based on regular season conference records, with the top team earning a bye into the semifinal round. The other six teams entered into the preliminary first round.

Bracket

References

Metro Conference men's basketball tournament
Tournament
Metro Conference men's basketball tournament
Metro Conference men's basketball tournament